A.P. Hill Army Airfield  is a military airport located at Fort A.P. Hill. It is two nautical miles (4 km) northwest of the central business district of Bowling Green, a town in Caroline County, Virginia, United States. The airfield has one active runway designated 5/23 with a 2,201 x 100 ft. (671 x 30 m) turf surface.

References

External links 
 

Airports in Virginia
Buildings and structures in Caroline County, Virginia
Transportation in Caroline County, Virginia
United States Army airfields